Elections to West Lindsey District Council in Lincolnshire, England were held on 6 May 1999. The whole council was up for election with boundary changes since the last election in 1998. The council stayed under no overall control.

Election result

3 Independent and 1 Conservative candidates were unopposed.

Ward results

References
"How the nations voted", The Times 8 May 1999 page 48
1999 West Lindsey election result
Ward results

1998
1999 English local elections
1990s in Lincolnshire